The Congolese Posts and Telecommunications Corporation is the public operator responsible for postal service in the Democratic Republic of the Congo. Didier Musete assumed the role of general director on 30 March 2021.

See also
 Communications in the Democratic Republic of the Congo

References

Companies of the Democratic Republic of the Congo
Democratic Republic of the Congo